Simon Hoogewerf (born May 11, 1963 in Beaverlodge, Alberta) is a Canadian athlete, dominant in the middle distances, primarily the 800m, during the 1980s. He competed for his native country in the 800 metres at the 1988 Summer Olympics, where he was eliminated in the semifinals.

See also
 Canadian records in track and field

External links
University of British Columbia Sports Hall of Fame biography

1963 births
Living people
Canadian male middle-distance runners
Sportspeople from Alberta
Sportspeople from British Columbia
Athletes (track and field) at the 1984 Summer Olympics
Athletes (track and field) at the 1988 Summer Olympics
Athletes (track and field) at the 1986 Commonwealth Games
Athletes (track and field) at the 1990 Commonwealth Games
Athletes (track and field) at the 1987 Pan American Games
Olympic track and field athletes of Canada
Commonwealth Games competitors for Canada
Pan American Games track and field athletes for Canada